A Grid Middleware Distribution is a software stack or a set of cooperating components, services and protocols which enable users access to the distributed resources of a grid.

The Grid Computing Middlewares 
 ARC
 DIET
 EMI
 gLite
 Globus toolkit
 GridWay
 The OMII-UK distribution
 Oracle Grid Engine
 Alchemi
 LSF
 GNU parallel
 GNU Queue
 HTCondor
 OpenLava
 pexec
 Nimrod (computing)

Job scheduling
Distributed computing

Computing-related lists